Jeena Teri Gali Mein (Hindi: जीना तेरी गली में) is a 2013 Indian, Bhojpuri language film directed by Rajkumar R. Pandey and presented by Sujit Tiwari. The Film Stars Pradeep Pandey "Chintu", Rinku Ghosh, Awadhesh Mishra, Priyanka Pandit, Anjana Singh and Sanjay Pandey.

Plot

Cast
Pradeep Pandey "Chintu"
Rinku Ghosh
Priyanka Pandit
Anjana Singh
Sanjay Pandey
Awadhesh Mishra

References

Indian action films
2010s Hindi-language films
Films directed by Rajkumar R. Pandey
2010s Bhojpuri-language films
2013 action films
2013 films